Mike Vito Massenzio (born November 1, 1982) is an American mixed martial artist who has competed as a Middleweight in the Ultimate Fighting Championship. He wrestled in New Jersey and was a two-time high school state champion in 2000 (160 lbs.) and 2001 (171 lbs.) at St. Joseph Regional High School in Montvale, New Jersey. Additionally in 2001, Mike was the U.S. National High School Wrestling Champion. In 2003, he was the Runner-up at the Junior College National Tournament and was crowned the National Champion in 2004.

Mixed martial arts career

Background
In Jujitsu and Submission Grappling, Mike has won numerous competitions in both N.A.G.A. and Grappler's Quest. In 2006 he was crowned the N.A.G.A. World Champion in the Expert Division of the Submission fighting competition.

===Current===
Mike is currently head coach for The Ridgewood Junior Wrestling Program in Ridgewood, New Jersey.

Ultimate Fighting Championship
Mike's first win for the promotion came over Drew McFedries via submission at UFC Fight Night: Diaz vs Neer in his UFC debut. However, Massenzio lost in his next bout to CB Dollaway on December 27, 2008, at UFC 92.

Massenzio then missed several months, before facing former WEC Light Heavyweight Champion Brian Stann, who was making his middleweight debut, on August 1, 2010 at UFC on Versus 2. Massenzio was submitted by a triangle choke midway through the final round. After second straight loss in the UFC he was released from the promotion.

Return to UFC
Massenzio next returned to the UFC replacing an injured Igor Pokrajac against Krzysztof Soszynski on June 11, 2011 at UFC 131. Massenzio took the fight at light heavyweight with only 3 days notice, despite normally fighting at middleweight. He lost the fight via unanimous decision (30-27, 30–26, 30–27).

Massenzio fought Steve Cantwell on October 8, 2011 at UFC 136. He won the fight via unanimous decision.

Massenzio faced Rousimar Palhares on January 14, 2012 at UFC 142  He lost the fight via submission when Palhares put him in a heel hook in the first round.

Massenzio faced Karlos Vemola on May 5, 2012 at UFC on Fox 3. He lost the bout in the second round due to a rear-naked choke and was subsequently released from the promotion once again.

Championships and accomplishments
Ultimate Fighting Championship
Fight of the Night (One time) vs. Brian Stann

Mixed martial arts record

|Loss
|align=center| 13–9
| Ariel Sepulveda
| Submission (rear-naked choke)
|Ring of Combat 44
| 
|align=center|3
|align=center|1:14
| Atlantic City, New Jersey, United States
|
|-
|Loss
|align=center| 13–8
| Ron Stallings
| TKO (knee to the body)
|Ring of Combat 42
| 
|align=center|1
|align=center|4:03
| Atlantic City, New Jersey, United States
|
|-
|Loss
|align=center| 13–7
| Karlos Vémola
| Submission (rear-naked choke)
|UFC on Fox: Diaz vs. Miller
| 
|align=center|2
|align=center|1:07
| East Rutherford, New Jersey, United States
| 
|-
|Loss
|align=center| 13–6
| Rousimar Palhares
| Submission (heel hook)
|UFC 142
| 
|align=center|1
|align=center|1:03
| Rio de Janeiro, Brazil
| 
|-
| Win
|align=center| 13–5
|Steve Cantwell
|Decision (unanimous)
|UFC 136
|
|align=center| 3
|align=center| 5:00
|Houston, Texas, United States
|
|-
|Loss
|align=center| 12–5
|Krzysztof Soszynski
|Decision (unanimous)
|UFC 131
|
|align=center| 3
|align=center| 5:00
|Vancouver, British Columbia, Canada
|
|-
|Win
|align=center|12–4
|Nate Kittredge
|TKO (punches)
|Combat Zone 37: Kicking It at the Rock 
|
|align=center| 2
|align=center| 3:32
|Salem, New Hampshire, United States
|
|-
|Loss
|align=center|11–4
|Brian Stann
|Submission (triangle choke)
|UFC Live: Jones vs. Matyushenko
|
|align=center|3
|align=center|3:10
|San Diego, California, United States
|
|-
|Loss
|align=center|11–3
|CB Dollaway
|TKO (punches)
|UFC 92
|
|align=center|1
|align=center|3:01
|Las Vegas, Nevada, United States
|
|-
|Win
|align=center|11–2
|Drew McFedries
|Submission (kimura)
|UFC Fight Night: Diaz vs Neer
|
|align=center|1
|align=center|1:28
|Omaha, Nebraska, United States
|
|-
|Loss
|align=center|10–2
|Danillo Villefort
|Submission (kneebar)
|IFL: Connecticut
|
|align=center|1
|align=center|3:25
|Uncasville, Connecticut, United States
|
|-
|Win
|align=center|10–1
|Lance Everson
|Submission (guillotine choke)
|Ring of Combat 17: Beast of the Northeast Finals 
|
|align=center|1
|align=center|4:04
|Atlantic City, New Jersey, United States
|
|-
|Win
|align=center|9–1
|Erik Charles
|Submission (north-south choke)
|Ring of Combat 16: Beast of the Northeast Semi-Finals
|
|align=center|1
|align=center|1:18
|Atlantic City, New Jersey, United States
|
|-
|Win
|align=center|8–1
|Dustin Cook
|Submission (rear-naked choke)
|Ring of Combat 15: Beast of the Northeast Quarterfinals
|
|align=center|2
|align=center|2:21
|Atlantic City, New Jersey, United States
|
|-
|Win
|align=center|7–1
|Eric Tavares
|Submission (rear-naked choke)
|Ring of Combat 14: Tournament of Champions Finals
|
|align=center|1
|align=center|3:34
|Atlantic City, New Jersey, United States
|
|-
|Win
|align=center|6–1
|Masakatsu Okuda
|Decision (unanimous)
|World Best Fighter: USA vs. Asia
|
|align=center|3
|align=center|N/A
|Atlantic City, New Jersey, United States
|
|-
|Win
|align=center|5–1
|Dante Rivera
|Decision (unanimous)
|Reality Fighting 13: Battle at the Beach 2006
|
|align=center|3
|align=center|5:00
|Wildwood, New Jersey, United States
|
|-
|Win
|align=center|4–1
|Dan Miller
|Decision (split)
|Reality Fighting 12: Return to Boardwalk Hall
|
|align=center|3
|align=center|3:00
|Atlantic City, New Jersey, United States
|
|-
|Win
|align=center|3–1
|Bill Scott
|TKO (doctor stoppage)
|Reality Fighting 11: Battle at Taj Mahal
|
|align=center|1
|align=center|3:00
|Atlantic City, New Jersey, United States
|
|-
|Win
|align=center|2–1
|Drew Puzon
|Decision (majority)
|Reality Fighting 10
|
|align=center|2
|align=center|5:00
|Atlantic City, New Jersey, United States
|
|-
|Loss
|align=center|1–1
|Jay Coleman
|TKO (punches)
|Reality Fighting 9: Battle at the Beach 2005
|
|align=center|2
|align=center|0:17
|Wildwood, New Jersey, United States
|
|-
|Win
|align=center|1–0
|Lionel Cortez
|Submission (keylock)
|Reality Fighting 8
|
|align=center|1
|align=center|2:05
|Atlantic City, New Jersey, United States
|

References

External links

UFC Profile

1982 births
Living people
American male mixed martial artists
Mixed martial artists from New Jersey
Middleweight mixed martial artists
Mixed martial artists utilizing Brazilian jiu-jitsu
American people of Italian descent
American practitioners of Brazilian jiu-jitsu
People from Teaneck, New Jersey
Sportspeople from Bergen County, New Jersey
Sportspeople from Paterson, New Jersey
Saint Joseph Regional High School alumni
Ultimate Fighting Championship male fighters